Chere Burger (born 11 June 1982) is a South African dressage rider. She competed at the 2014 World Equestrian Games in Normandy where she finished 20th with the South African team in the team competition and 82nd in the individual dressage competition.

References

External links
 

Living people
1982 births
South African female equestrians
South African dressage riders
Place of birth missing (living people)